Leopold William Jerome Fane De Salis (12 June 1845 – 3 August 1930) was an Australian politician.

He was the son of Leopold Fane De Salis and Charlotte Macdonald; his brother George De Salis would also enter politics. He was elected to the New South Wales Legislative Assembly for Queanbeyan in 1872, but did not re-contest in 1874. He managed the family estates in Queensland until 1892, when they were lost in the economic crash. In 1895 he married Jeanette Armstrong. De Salis moved to England in 1910 and died in 1930 at Laleham.

References

 

1845 births
1930 deaths
Members of the New South Wales Legislative Assembly